See Also:Prince of Hohenlohe-Langenburg

Princess of Hohenlohe-Langenburg 

  
Hohenlohe-Langenburg